Veronica Malone (formerly Peter Donovan Malone) was a swimming coach from the United States. She served as the head coach and general manager for the Kansas City Blazers Swim Team in Kansas City, Kansas & Missouri from 1975 to 2010.

Following retirement from coaching, Malone began gender transition, and is now known as Veronica Malone.

Accomplishments 
Malone is a graduate of the University of Toledo in Business Management and also has an Education Degree. Before coaching with the KC Blazers, she was an assistant coach at the Greater Toledo Aquatic Club from 1968 to 1975. 

Some of Coach Malone's accomplishments/positions include:
 USA Swimming's Top 25 Most Influential People in the History of Swimming
 recipient of the 2001 USA Swimming Award, for outstanding contribution to the United States and to the Sport of Swimming
 USA Swimming's Olympic International Operations Committee member (1984–2008)
 USA Women's Swimming head coach, 2004 Short Course Worlds
 USA Women's Swimming head coach, 1999 Pan American Games 
 USA Swimming's board of directors member: 1982–1986 and 1992–1996 (as Central Zone Director)
 USA Swimming's National Steering Committee, 1992–2004
 USA Swimming's Senior Development Committee chair: 2004–2008
 USA Swimming's National Time Standards Committee chair
 Consulting coach to the 1988, 1992, and 1996 U.S. Olympic Teams
 Assistant coach, USA National Team: 1981, 1985, 1988, 1991, and 1993
 Head coach, USA team at 1994 World Championships
 Head coach, 1996 USA Swimming Junior Team
 Vice president, American Swimming Coaches Association (ASCA), 1995–2001, 2002–2007
 ASCA Board of Directors 1991–1994, 1995–2004
 ASCA Certificates of Excellence recipient 1977–2009, including the Gold award for over 20 years of national-level coaching achievement
 ASCA Hall of Fame inductee in 2009

References 

Living people
Year of birth missing (living people)
University of Toledo alumni